Neil King (born September 10, 1988) is a professional Canadian football defensive back who is currently a free agent. He most recently played for the Edmonton Elks of the Canadian Football League (CFL) for three seasons before he was released by the team on January 15, 2019. He has also played for the Hamilton Tiger-Cats for three seasons. He was drafted by the Tiger-Cats 43rd overall in the fifth round of the 2013 CFL Draft and signed with the team on May 27, 2013. He played CIS Football for the Saint Mary's Huskies.

References

External links
Hamilton Tiger-Cats bio 

1988 births
Canadian football defensive backs
Edmonton Elks players
Hamilton Tiger-Cats players
Living people
Players of Canadian football from Alberta
Saint Mary's Huskies football players
Canadian football people from Edmonton